Roger Tatley is a gallerist and former art magazine editor now based in London.

He's a senior director at Goodman Gallery, having previously been part of the managerial teams at Marian Goodman Gallery, Hauser & Wirth, and Alison Jacques Gallery. 

Tatley worked for Artforum, Dazed & Confused, Booth–Clibborn Editions, and Contemporary magazine before being appointed editor in chief of Modern Painters by James Truman in 2006, when it relocated from London to New York.

He has edited a number of books on art, photography, film and architecture and was listed in the Evening Standard's '1000 Most Influential People in London' in 2014 and 2015.

References

https://web.archive.org/web/20140413150034/http://theartnewspaper.com/articles/Friendly-face-for-Goodman-in-London/32338
http://www.mediaweek.com/mw/news/print/article_display.jsp?vnu_content_id=1002461884 Stephanie D. Smith, May 3, 2006, mediaweek.com.
https://www.standard.co.uk/news/the1000/the-1000--londons-most-influential-people-2014-the-arts-9784853.html
http://news.artnet.com/in-brief/so-whos-boss-in-the-london-art-scene-140439

English magazine editors
Living people
Year of birth missing (living people)